Mavrodin is a commune in Teleorman County, Muntenia, Romania. It is composed of a single village, Mavrodin. It also included two other villages until 2003, when they were split off to form Nenciulești Commune.

References

Communes in Teleorman County
Localities in Muntenia